Battista Paganelli (born 16 May 1953) is an Italian rower. He competed in the men's coxed four event at the 1976 Summer Olympics.

References

1953 births
Living people
Italian male rowers
Olympic rowers of Italy
Rowers at the 1976 Summer Olympics
Place of birth missing (living people)